Taj Mahal is a 1999 Tamil-language romantic drama film directed by Bharathiraja. The film stars his son, Manoj, and Riya Sen in their debut as lead actors, with a supporting ensemble cast including Revathi, Raadhika, and Ranjitha. The film was written by Mani Ratnam while the music was composed by A. R. Rahman and B. Kannan handled the camera. The story of the film revolved around two clashing communities and two lovers caught in the vortex of their rivalry. The film was released during Diwali in 1999 and fared poorly at the box office.

Plot
Thiruppaachi and Sengulam are neighboring villages with a history of enmity between them. Maayan and Machakanni meet on the day of her engagement and it is love at first sight. Her marriage itself gets called off when the groom and his family insult Machakanni's family and her romance with Maayan continues. However, when her brother finds out about him, all hell breaks loose. The turned-down bridegroom is still itching for revenge and figuring out that the only way to extract it is to marry Machakanni, he pleads for forgiveness and succeeds in melting her brother's heart. The marriage is finalised but Maayan's friends swear to unite the star-crossed lovers. There is also a subplot of Maayan's aunt trying to get her daughter married off to Maayan.

Cast

Production
Bharathiraja introduced his son Manoj as an actor with the film, stating that his son should appear as an actor before fulfilling his dreams of working as a part of the crew. Riya Sen, daughter of Hindi actress Moon Moon Sen was signed on to play the leading female role. Leading film-maker Mani Ratnam wrote the story for the film, while Rajiv Menon was also involved in initial script discussions but opted out after the film became a village-centric project. A. R. Rahman was signed to score the music while veteran cinematographers B. Kannan and Madhu Ambat also signed the project, ending a long hiatus in Tamil films. The team started pre-production work in late 1997 and shooting began in 1998, with the project becoming Janani Cine Arts' most expensive production to date.

During production, Bharathiraja considered giving his son a stage name of Manibharathi, but ultimately opted against doing so. An exact replica of the Taj Mahal on Marina beach in Madras for a song sequence. The film was shot across areas including Kulu Manali, Badhami, Hampi, Bellari and Poomparai.

The film was initially slated to face a box office battle with several other big films, notably Kamal Haasan's Hey Ram, Mani Ratnam's Alaipayuthey, Rajiv Menon's Kandukondain Kandukondain, and Shankar's Mudhalvan, but the delay of the first three gave Taj Mahal a possible leeway to become a success.

Release
The New Indian Express gave the film a mixed review citing that it was "vintage Bharatiraja at his best", while also adding that Riya Sen "shines in spite of an alien language and the totally strange cultural milieu in which she is placed". The reviewer adds that "song picturisation is brilliant and Revathy and Radhika, both favourite ex-heroines of the director, put up an impressive show." The critic also labels that the "only eyesore is hero Manoj" and that "Bharatiraja has been a little over-ambitious here and could have edited at least 20% of the film, including many unnecessary action scenes."

The film became a financial failure at the box office and Manoj's career failed to take off despite a high-profile launch. The film was also set to be dubbed and released in Telugu, but the financial losses suffered had deterred the version.

Soundtrack

The soundtrack features 10 songs composed by A. R. Rahman and lyrics by Vairamuthu. The album marked Rahman's fourth collaboration with Bharathiraja. The songs were noted for the extensive use of traditional instruments. Rahman introduced several singers into the Tamil music scene, the most notable being Palakkad Sreeram. He sang a dappan koothu style song "Thirupaachi".

References

External links

1999 films
1999 romantic drama films
Films directed by Bharathiraja
1990s Tamil-language films
Films scored by A. R. Rahman
Indian romantic drama films
Films shot in Kollam